The 2022–23 Eastern Michigan Eagles men's basketball team represented Eastern Michigan University during the 2022–23 NCAA Division I men's basketball season. The Eagles, led by second-year head coach Stan Heath, played their home games at the George Gervin GameAbove Center in Ypsilanti, Michigan as members of the Mid-American Conference. They finished 8–23 with a 5–13 MAC record.  They finished tied for ninth in the MAC and failed to qualify for the MAC tournament.

Previous season

The Eagles finished the 2021–22 season 10–21 and 5–15 in MAC play to finish in eleventh place. They failed to qualify for the MAC tournament.

Offseason

Departures

Incoming transfers

Recruiting class

Roster

Schedule and results

|-
!colspan=9 style=|Exhibition

|-
!colspan=9 style=|Non-conference regular season

|-
!colspan=9 style=| MAC regular season
|-

Source

References

Eastern Michigan Eagles men's basketball seasons
Eastern Michigan
Eastern Michigan Eagles men's basketball
Eastern Michigan Eagles men's basketball